Sar Posht is a village in Deh Bakri Rural District, in the Central District of Bam County, Kerman Province, Iran. At the 2006 census, its population was 124, in 33 families.

References 

Populated places in Bam County